Carbone is a surname.

Carbone may also refer to:

Carbone, Basilicata, a commune in Italy
Carbone (restaurant), an Italian restaurant in New York City
Carbones, a class of molecules
Mount Carbone, Marie Byrd Land, Antarctica
UW Carbone Cancer Center, Madison, Wisconsin, part of the University of Wisconsin